Wittenberg University is a private liberal arts college in Springfield, Ohio. It has 1,326 full-time students representing 33 states and 9 foreign countries. Wittenberg University is associated with the Evangelical Lutheran Church in America.

History
Wittenberg College (it became Wittenberg University in 1957) was founded in 1845 by a group of ministers in the English Evangelical Lutheran Synod of Ohio, which had previously separated from the recently established German-speaking Evangelical Lutheran Joint Synod of Ohio and Other States.

A German American pastor of the Evangelical Lutheran Church, the Rev. Ezra Keller was the principal founder and first president of the college. Its initial focus was to train clergy with the Hamma School of Divinity as its theological department. One of its main missions was to "Americanize" Lutherans by teaching courses in the English language instead of German, unlike the nearby Capital University in Columbus, Ohio.

The first class originally consisted of eight students at the beginning of the academic year, but grew to seventy-one by the end. With a faculty of one professor and two tutors, classes were held in Springfield, Ohio, in a church on land that was donated. That city was selected for its location on the National Road, running from the eastern cities of Baltimore and Cumberland, Maryland, to the west in the Illinois Country, eventually to the territorial capital of Vandalia, near the Mississippi River.

In 1874, women were admitted to the college, and, the following year, blacks were admitted. The college was named for the historic University of Wittenberg in Wittenberg, Germany, the town in which Martin Luther famously posted his Ninety-five Theses on the church door on October 31, 1517. In 1993 the university and the German city entered into an official partnership.

In 1995, the American Philosophical Association censured Wittenberg University when the Wittenberg administration overruled the faculty personnel board and denied a faculty member tenure. The university was censured again in 2021, this time by the American Association of University Professors (AAUP), for discontinuing eight academic programs and firing two tenured faculty members without, in the AAUP's opinion, respecting faculty rights.

Hamma Divinity School
Luther Alexander Gotwald, Professor of Theology in the Hamma Divinity School that served as the theological department of the college, was famously tried for and unanimously acquitted of heresy by the board of directors at Wittenberg on April 4–5, 1893. The trial concerned many key issues that Evangelical Lutherans still debate today.

For decades, Hamma and Wittenberg in Springfield were associated with the local English-speaking regional Lutheran synods in the Midwest.

In 1978, Hamma Divinity School merged with the nearby Evangelical Lutheran Theological Seminary (associated with Capital University) in the Bexley suburb of Columbus, Ohio, to form Trinity Lutheran Seminary.

Presidents

 Ezra Keller (1844–1848)
 Samuel Sprecher (1849–1874)
 John B. Helwig (1874–1882)
 Samuel Alfred Ort (1882–1900)
 John M. Ruthrauff (1900–1902)
 Charles G. Heckert (1903–1920)
 Rees Edgar Tulloss (1920–1949)
 Clarence Charles Stoughton (1949–1963)
 John Nissley Stauffer (1963–1968)
 G. Kenneth Andeen (1969–1974)
 William A. Kinnison (1974–1995)
 Baird Tipson (1995–2004)
 William H. Steinbrink (Interim President)
 Mark H. Erickson (2005–2012)
 Laurie M. Joyner (2012–2015)
 Richard "Dick" Helton (2016–2017) (Interim President)
 Michael Frandsen (2017–present)

Academics

Wittenberg offers more than 70 majors and special programs. Eight pre-professional programs are offered to students, 70 percent of whom eventually pursue graduate studies. The institution's science facilities are housed in the Barbara Deer Kuss Science Center. Krieg Hall is the home of the music department. Wittenberg's art department is housed in Koch Hall. Thomas Library contains 400,000 volumes and provides access to OhioLINK, a consortium of Ohio college and university libraries and the State Library of Ohio. The library houses the Kemper Special Collection Area which contains the Luther-Reformation Collection with more than 400 items written by Martin Luther and his contemporaries between 1517 and 1580. The library was built in 1956 to the designs of Thomas Norman Mansell of Mansell, Lewis & Fugate of Wynnewood, Pennsylvania.

Rankings and honors

Campus

Blair Hall
Blair Hall houses the university's education department. The Springfield-Wittenberg Teacher Institute and Upward Bound are housed in Blair. Upward Bound is a high school program for students in low-income areas of the city to receive a high level education from college professors while in high school.

The education department occupies a second building at 49 East College Avenue that formerly contained the administration offices of the Springfield Public City Schools, but is now owned by Wittenberg University.

Carnegie Hall

The athletic department in currently housed in Carnegie Hall, named for the famous Scottish-American immigrant and steel industrialist Andrew Carnegie, (1835–1919), who was known for his philanthropy and endowment of many public library buildings across the country.

Hollenbeck Hall
Hollenbeck Hall is home to the History, English, Foreign Languages, Political Science, International Studies, and Philosophy departments, and the Office of International Education. The building's six wings, two per floor, are separated by the Ness Family Auditorium in the center of the building. It is also the home of the Writing Center and Foreign Language Learning Center, two of the predominantly student-run organizations.

Barbara Deer Kuss Science Center
The Barbara Deer Kuss Science Center houses ten academic departments in the fields of mathematics and natural sciences. It also serves as a popular breakfast and lunch location for students, as it includes a vendor on the first floor that can be used with the Wittenberg meal plans.

Recitation Hall
Recitation Hall was the second building erected on the campus. It contains many of the university's administrative offices, including admissions, financial aid, president's office, provost's, student employment, university communications (Wittenberg's Media office for "Wittenberg Magazine", Press office, New Media, Sports Media, and Publications office), and human resources. Recitation Hall also has its own chapel. In 1883, classes were first held in Recitation Hall. A building behind Recitation Hall serves as the university's police and security headquarters, the campus switchboard and the transportation office.

Synod Hall
Synod Hall is home to the Department of Sociology and Information Technologies (IT).

Zimmerman Hall
Zimmerman Hall is home to the Department of Psychology.

Shouvlin Center
Shouvlin Center houses the Department of Nursing, the School of Graduate and Professional Studies, Womyn's Center, Counseling Services, and Medical Services.

Thomas Library
Thomas Library is Wittenberg's main library. The building holds over 500,000 books and resources. Wittenberg is also a member of OhioLINK.

The Steemer

In April 2017, Wittenberg University broke ground on the development of a forty million dollar health, wellness, and athletics facility to supplement the existing Health Physical Education and Recreation (HPER) Center. This project will include the renovation of the university's 1929 Field House, 1982 HPER Center, and include a new indoor practice field, classrooms, and locker rooms. The project is expected to be completed by the end of 2019. In September 2018, it was announced the facility would be named "The Steemer", after the company Stanley Steemer, whose CEO, Wes Bates, is a graduate of Wittenberg and a major financial sponsor of the project.

Athletics

Wittenberg University teams participate as a member of the National Collegiate Athletic Association's Division III. The Tigers are a member of the North Coast Athletic Conference (NCAC). Men's sports include baseball, basketball, cross country, football, golf, lacrosse, soccer, swimming & diving, tennis, track & field and volleyball; while women's sports include basketball, cross country, field hockey, golf, lacrosse, soccer, softball, swimming & diving, tennis, track & field and volleyball. The school's newest varsity sport for men, volleyball, was added in the 2015–16 school year (2016 season); that team began play in the Midwest Collegiate Volleyball League (MCVL), left after the 2018 season for single-sport membership in the Allegheny Mountain Collegiate Conference, and returned to the MCVL after the 2020 season. The newest women's varsity sport, water polo, was added to the 2018–19 school year. That team plays in the Division III varsity division of the Collegiate Water Polo Association.

In 2017 the men's golf team won the Division III National Championship.

In 2017 the women's volleyball team competed in the NCAA Division III National Championship, rising to Division III runner-up.

Wittenberg ended the 2009 fall sports season ranked 16th among more than 430 NCAA Division III schools in the Learfield Sports Directors Cup standings, administered by the National Association of Collegiate Directors of Athletics (NACDA)

Student organizations
The university has over 100 active, registered student organizations.

Hagen Center for Civic and Urban Engagement
Wittenberg University opened the Hagen Center for Civic and Urban Engagement on 24 September 2008, to help coordinate community service projects. It builds partnerships between the university and city, state and federal governments. Dr. Kimberly Creasap is the faculty director.

Womyn's Center
The university's Womyn's Center is located in Shouvlin Center. It has included the Peer Advocate program since 2016, providing advocacy services for survivors of power-based violence (regardless of gender identity). The Womyn's Center also houses Tiger Health Educators, a peer-to-peer education program that offers training and resources regarding sexual health and consent.

William C. McClain Center for Diversity
The William C. McClain Center for Diversity is located on Alumni Way and is named for the first African American to graduate from Wittenberg University in 1934. Wittenberg also has several multicultural student programs that are supported by the diversity center including Shades of Pearl, Concerned Black Students, the Gender and Sexuality Diversity Alliance, and the American International Association.

Radio station

The university has a student-run 24-hour radio station, WUSO, on 89.1 FM. WUSO simulcasts the Dayton classical station WDPR on weekday mornings, filling the remaining hours with news, politics, sports, food, and music shows. The Tiger Sports Network broadcasts the sports programming. The station's studios are located in the basement of Firestine Hall on Woodlawn Ave. The radio station's website allows audio streaming.

The launch of a new media program called the Integrated Media Corps has recently developed. A team of ten university students creates and produces news videos, sports highlight videos for Dayton, Ohio, television stations WDTN, WHIO, and WKEF and for the university website. The team also records news stories for WUSO and writes press releases for the university website. The program also has begun broadcasting sports programs on WIZE-AM in Springfield.

The Wittenberg Torch
The Torch is Wittenberg University's weekly student-run newspaper; it is staffed by news reporters, editors, features writers, sportswriters, designers and photographers. The paper was founded in 1873 and celebrated its 100th volume in 2012. In 2012, The Torch also won an ACP Online Pacemaker Award.  In 2020, due to the COVID-19 pandemic, The Wittenberg Torch ended the print copies of their newspaper and moved to a fully digital format.

Residence life

Wittenberg's residence halls on campus are Tower Hall, Myers Hall, Firestine Hall, Ferncliff Hall, Woodlawn Hall, New Residence Hall, and Polis House. Myers Hall is the oldest, the first campus building when the university opened. The building was added to the National Register of Historic Places in 1975. It now houses the University Honors Program. The newest residence hall, New Hall, opened in 2006. The Polis House was formerly the international residence hall on campus. Students who are at junior or senior standing have the option to live in the university-provided on-campus apartments or off-campus in apartments or university rental houses.

The Benham-Pence Student Center houses most of the university's dining services. The main floor of the student center houses Post 95 which offers four different options, including Champ City Grill, Ward & Wood Subs, The Pour, and Ezra's (serving prepared-to-order stirfry). Founders Pub, in the basement of the student center, was opened in 2009. The Campus Dining Room is on the second floor of the Student Center along with the faculty dining room. Breakfast and lunch are also served on weekdays in the Barbara Deer Kuss Science Center's "Simply To Go" cafe.

Greek life
Wittenberg has an active Greek Life community with ten fraternities or sororities currently chartered on campus.

Fraternities:
 Beta Theta Pi (Alpha Gamma chapter)
 Phi Kappa Psi (Ohio Beta chapter)
 Delta Tau Delta (Iota Beta chapter)
 Delta Sigma Phi (Beta Iota chapter)

Sororities:
 Alpha Delta Pi (Chi chapter)
 Delta Gamma (Gamma Rho chapter)
 Gamma Phi Beta (Alpha Nu chapter)
 Kappa Delta (Alpha Nu chapter)
 Sigma Kappa (Gamma Omega chapter)
 Alpha Xi Delta (Zeta chapter)

Notable alumni

 Brian Agler, basketball coach, formerly the head coach of WNBA's Seattle Storm, now coach of the Los Angeles Sparks 
 Sherwood Anderson, writer
 Mark A. Boyer, Ph.D. 1988, Board of Trustees Distinguished Professor of Political Science, University of Connecticut
 Jennette Bradley, former Lieutenant Governor of Ohio and Ohio State Treasurer
 Albert Bryan, Governor of the United States Virgin Islands
 Barry Burden, Ph.D. 1998, professor of political science, University of Wisconsin-Madison
 John Chowning, American musician, inventor and professor
 Al Davis, owner of the Oakland Raiders NFL franchise, attended Wittenberg University but graduated from Syracuse University 1950
 Lloyd C. Douglas, minister and author
 Paul Dressel (B.A. 1931), American educational psychologist
 Sandy Dukat, American athlete
 Fritz W. Ermarth, recipient of the Distinguished Intelligence Medal and the National Intelligence Distinguished Service Medal; Director of Security Programs, Nixon Center
 Gregory L. Frost, United States federal judge
 Peter S. Grosscup, Judge U.S. Seventh Circuit Court of Appeals, 1899–1911
 Thomas Hyland, professional blackjack player, Blackjack Hall of Fame inductee
 Isaac Kaufmann Funk, editor, lexicographer, publisher; founder of Funk & Wagnalls Company publishing firm
 Benjamin Thurman Hacker (1935–2003), U.S. Navy Officer, first Naval Flight Officer to achieve flag rank
 Mark Henninger, American football coach
 Lauren Schmidt Hissrich, television writer
 Jonathan Howes (bachelor's degree 1959), urban planner and politician, mayor of Chapel Hill, North Carolina (1987–1991)
 George Izenour (BA, 1934; MA 1936), theatre designer, author, and educator
 Elwood V. Jensen, scientist
 James G. Johnson, justice of the Supreme Court of Ohio
 Taver Johnson, American football coach
 David Ward King, inventor of the King Road Drag
 George Philip Krapp, professor of English at Columbia University
 Ron Lancaster, 4-time Grey Cup-winning CFL quarterback and coach, member of the Canadian Football Hall of Fame
 Pierre Lhomme, French cinematographer
 Ronald Fook Shiu Li, founder of the Hong Kong Stock Exchange
 Douglas E. Lumpkin, director of the Ohio Department of Job and Family Services
 James Marcia, psychologist of identity development
 Robert J. Marshall, president of the Lutheran Church of America
 William C. Martin, University of Michigan athletic director, 2000–2009; founder, Bank of Ann Arbor; founder, First Martin Corp.; former president of the United States Olympic Committee
 John E. McLaughlin, former Deputy Director of the Central Intelligence Agency, senior fellow at the Paul H. Nitze School of Advanced International Studies and Brookings Institution
 Eldon Miller – former men's college basketball coach at Wittenberg University, Western Michigan University, Ohio State University, and the University of Northern Iowa
 Minnie Willis Baines Miller (A.M.), author
 John Warwick Montgomery, American lawyer, professor, theologian and academic known for his work in the field of Christian apologetics. (M.Div., 1958)
 Waldo Nelson, pediatrician and author of the Nelson Textbook of Pediatrics
 A. John Pelander, justice of the Arizona Supreme Court
 ZeBarney Thorne Phillips, Chaplain of the U.S. Senate, 1927–1942
 Sandra Postel, founder and director of the Global Water Policy Project, Fellow of the National Geographic Society, environmentalist and author.
 Jere Ratcliffe, Chief Scout Executive of Boy Scouts of America, from 1993 to 2000.
 Hugh M. Raup, American botanist and ecologist
 Robert Bruce Raup, philosopher and writer
 James Rebhorn, actor
 Matthew Shay, president and CEO of the National Retail Federation
 Barbara Shearer, pianist
 Thomas D. Shepard, Los Angeles City Council member, 1961–67
 Sheila Simon, Lieutenant Governor of Illinois
 Augustus N. Summers, Justice of the Ohio Supreme Court, 1904–1911
 Jennifer Vanderpool, visual artist
 Edward Vollrath (attended 1879–1881), U.S. Army brigadier general
 Adam Willis Wagnalls, Funk & Wagnalls Company co-founder
 Helen Bosart Morgan Wagstaff, artist, first president of the Springfield Art Association 
 Walter L. Weaver, U.S. Representative from Ohio
 Karl Weick, organizational theorist at the University of Michigan
 Charles B. Zimmerman, Associate Justice of the Ohio Supreme Court, 1933 and 1934–1949

References

External links

Official website

 
Buildings and structures in Springfield, Ohio
Private universities and colleges in Ohio
Educational institutions established in 1845
Education in Clark County, Ohio
Tourist attractions in Clark County, Ohio
German-American culture in Ohio
1845 establishments in Ohio